Ricardo Antonio Escobar Acuña (born 30 March 1998) is a Chilean footballer who plays for Coquimbo Unido on loan from Audax Italiano as a defender.

Personal life
He has been pursuing a career in Business Administration at the same time he plays professional football.

Honours
Coquimbo Unido
 Primera B (1): 2021

References

1998 births
Living people
Chilean footballers
Andrés Bello National University alumni
Chilean Primera División players
Primera B de Chile players
Audax Italiano footballers
Magallanes footballers
Deportes Magallanes footballers
Coquimbo Unido footballers
Association football defenders
Place of birth missing (living people)